Tuva Moflag  (born 17 March 1979) is a Norwegian politician for the Labour Party. She has been member of the Storting since 2017.

Political career
Moflag served as mayor of Ski from 2015 to 2017, and was elected representative to the Storting for the period 2017–2021 for the Labour Party, from the constituency of Akershus. In the Storting, she was a member of the Standing Committee on Health and Care Services from 2017 to 2021. From 2017 to 2018 she was a delegate to the United Nations General Assembly.

She was re-elected to the Storting for the period 2021–2025. From 2021 she was a member of the Standing Committee on Labour and Social Affairs, where she was second deputy leader.

Personal life
Moflag was born in Oslo on 17 March 1979, a daughter of Erling Moflag and Turid Petrine Svaleng. She graduated as an economist from the Bodø University College in 2002.

References

1979 births
Living people
Labour Party (Norway) politicians
University of Nordland alumni
Members of the Storting
Mayors of places in Akershus
Women mayors of places in Norway
People from Ski, Norway
Women members of the Storting